John Robert Magaro (born February 16, 1983) is an American actor. He starred in Not Fade Away. He also had roles in The Big Short, Carol, and the Netflix series Orange Is the New Black and The Umbrella Academy. He made his Broadway debut as Earl Williams, the escaped convict, in the revival of The Front Page in 2016.

Life and career
John Magaro was born February 16, 1983, in Akron, Ohio, the son of Wendy and James Magaro, and grew up in its nearby suburb of Munroe Falls. His father is of Italian descent and his mother is Jewish; he was raised in his mother's religion. His parents were teachers. While attending school within the Stow-Munroe Falls City School District, John began acting in local theater, including shows at the Cleveland Play House and the Kent State Porthouse Theatre at Blossom Music Center, and Weathervane Playhouse in Akron, Ohio. As a youth, John Magaro also appeared in television commercials, and had a role in a Rescue 911 episode. In addition John was a member of the Stow-Monroe Falls swim team.

After graduating from Stow-Munroe Falls High School in 2001, John went on to study theater at Point Park University in Pittsburgh. John Magaro lives in and works out of New York. Among his acting highlights are The Big Short and Carol (2015). His early film work included The Brave One, the HBO film Taking Chance and a lead role in the horror film My Soul to Take. John also appeared in eleven episodes of Orange Is the New Black, spanning seasons 3-7.

Magaro was the lead in the 2012 film Not Fade Away, which earned him the HFF Spotlight award. In 2019 he portrayed the lead role of “Cookie” in Kelly Reichardt’s critically acclaimed film First Cow, for which he was nominated for a 2020 Gotham Award as Best Actor.

Filmography

Film

Television

Video games

References

External links

1983 births
American male film actors
American male stage actors
American male television actors
Jewish American male actors
Living people
Male actors from Akron, Ohio
Point Park University alumni
21st-century American male actors
American people of Italian descent
20th-century American male actors
American male child actors
American male video game actors
21st-century American Jews